Spare or Spares may refer to:

Common meanings
 Spare (bowling), a term for knocking down all the pins using two bowling balls
 short for spare part
 Spare tire

People
 Austin Osman Spare (1886–1956), English artist and occultist
 Richard Spare (born 1951), British artist
 Charlie Spares (1917–1958), British jockey

Other uses
 Spāre Station, a railway station in Spāre, Latvia
 Spare (memoir), 2023 memoir by Prince Harry, Duke of Sussex
 Spares, a 1996 novel by Michael Marshall Smith